Emil Heinrich du Bois-Reymond (7 November 181826 December 1896) was a German physiologist, the co-discoverer of nerve action potential, and the developer of experimental electrophysiology.

Life
Du Bois-Reymond was born in Berlin and spent his life there. His younger brother was the mathematician Paul du Bois-Reymond (1831–1889). His father was a poor immigrant from Neuchâtel, and his mother was a Berliner of prominent Huguenot origin.

Educated first at the French College in Berlin, du Bois-Reymond enrolled in the University of Berlin in 1838. He seems to have been uncertain at first as to the topic of his studies, for he was a student of the renowned ecclesiastical historian August Neander, and dallied with geology and physics, but eventually began to study medicine with such zeal and success as to attract the notice of Johannes Peter Müller (1801–1858), a well-known professor of anatomy and physiology.

Müller's earlier studies had been distinctly physiological, but his preferences caused him later to study comparative anatomy. He had, about the time when the young du Bois-Reymond came to his lectures, published his Elements of Physiology, in which the following statement occurs:
"Though there appears to be something in the phenomena of living beings which cannot be explained by ordinary mechanical, physical or chemical laws, much may be so explained, and we may without fear push these explanations as far as we can, so long as we keep to the solid ground of observation and experiment."
During 1840 Müller made du Bois-Reymond his assistant in physiology, and as the beginning of an inquiry gave him a copy of the essay which the Italian Carlo Matteucci had just published on the electric phenomena of animals. This determined the work of du Bois-Reymond's life. He chose as the subject of his graduation thesis Electric fishes, and so commenced a long series of investigations on bioelectricity. The results of these inquiries were made known partly in papers communicated to scientific journals, but also and chiefly by his work Investigations of Animal Electricity, the first part of which was published in 1848, the last in 1884.

In 1852 while living alone and unable to get a professorship he traveled to England and met a distant cousin named Jeannette Claude whom he courted and married in 1853.
Concerning his religious opinions, du Bois-Reymond was an atheist or at best agnostic.

Works

Investigations of Animal Electricity may be seen in two ways. On the one hand, it is a record of the exact determination and approximative analysis of the electric phenomena presented by living beings. Viewed from this standpoint, it represents a significant advance in biological knowledge. Du Bois-Reymond built up this branch of science, by inventing or improving methods, by devising new instruments of observation, or by adapting old ones. On the other hand, the volumes in question contain an exposition of a theory of bioelectricity. In them Du Bois-Reymond put forward a general conception that a living tissue, such as muscle, might be regarded as composed of a number of electric molecules, and that the electric behavior of the muscle was the product of these elementary units. We now know that these are sodium, potassium and other ions, the gradients of which are responsible for maintaining membrane potentials in excitable cells.

His theory was soon criticized by several contemporary physiologists, such as Ludimar Hermann, who maintained that intact living tissue such as muscle does not generate electric currents unless it has suffered injury. The subsequent controversy was ultimately resolved in 1902 by du Bois-Reymond's student Julius Bernstein, who incorporated parts of both theories into an ionic model of action potential. Thus, du Bois-Reymond's work focused on animal electricity, although he made other physiological inquiries — such as could be studied by physical methods — concerning the phenomena of diffusion, the muscular production of lactic acid, and the development of shocks by electric fishes.

Du Bois-Reymond exerted great influence as a teacher. In 1858, upon the death of Johannes Müller, the professorship of anatomy and physiology at the University of Berlin was divided into a professorship of human and comparative anatomy, which was given to Karl Bogislaus Reichert (1811–1883), and a professorship of physiology, which was given to du Bois-Reymond. This he held until his death, performing research for many years without adequate accommodation. In 1877, the Prussian government granted his wish and provided the university with a modern physiological laboratory.

In 1851 he was admitted to the Academy of Sciences of Berlin, and in 1876 he became its perpetual secretary. Like his friend Hermann von Helmholtz, who had also studied under Johannes Peter Müller, du Bois-Reymond was known throughout Germany. He used his influence for the advancement of science, introducing the theories of thermodynamics and Darwin to students at the University of Berlin. He owed the largest part of his fame, however, to occasional discourses on literature, history, and philosophy.

Oratory

On nationalism
Following France's declaration of war on Prussia on 3 August 1870, du Bois-Reymond proclaimed that "the University of Berlin, quartered opposite the King's palace, is, by the deed of its foundation, the intellectual bodyguard (geistige Leibregiment) of the House of Hohenzollern." But by the time of France's surrender on 26 January 1871 du Bois-Reymond had come to regret his words, lamenting the "national hatred of two embittered peoples." His 1878 lecture "On National Feeling" expanded on this topic, offering one of the earliest analyses of nationalism after those of Lord Acton and Fustel de Coulanges.

On Darwinism
Du Bois-Reymond was the first German professor to convert to Darwinism. He expounded the theory in popular classes at the University of Berlin, in itinerant lectures in the Ruhr and the Rhineland, and in formal addresses translated and reprinted across Europe and North America. Unlike his rival Ernst Haeckel, du Bois-Reymond espoused a mechanistic interpretation of natural selection that anticipated modern views. Few in Germany took offense at his teachings until 1883, when his obituary to Darwin outraged conservatives and Catholics.

On epistemology
In 1880 du Bois-Reymond delivered a speech to the Berlin Academy of Sciences enumerating seven "world riddles" or "shortcomings" of science:

 the ultimate nature of matter and force;
 the origin of motion;
 the origin of life;
 the "apparently teleological arrangements of nature" (not an "absolutely transcendent riddle");
 the origin of simple sensations ("a quite transcendent" question);
 the origin of intelligent thought and language (which might be known if the origin of sensations could be known); and
 the question of free will.
Concerning numbers 1, 2 and 5 he proclaimed "Ignorabimus" ("we will never know"). Concerning number 7 he proclaimed "Dubitemus" ("we doubt it').

References

Sources

Cranefield, Paul F. (1 October 1957). "The Organic Physics of 1847 and the Biophysics of Today". Journal of the History of Medicine and Allied Sciences. XII (10): 407–423. doi:10.1093/jhmas/XII.10.407. ISSN 0022-5045.
Lenoir, Timothy (1 January 1986). "Models and Instruments in the Development of Electrophysiology, 1845–1912". Historical Studies in the Physical and Biological Sciences. 17 (1): 1–54. doi:10.2307/27757574. ISSN 0890-9997.
Naturwissen und Erkenntnis im 19. Jahrhundert : Emil Du Bois-Reymond. Mann, Gunter, ed. Akademie der Wissenschaften und der Literatur. Kommission für Geschichte der Medizin und der Naturwissenschaften. Hildesheim: Gerstenberg, 1981. . OCLC 8307620.

External links

Short biography, bibliography, and links on digitized sources in the Virtual Laboratory of the Max Planck Institute for the History of Science
Essay on Emil du Bois-Reymond at The MIT Press Reader

1818 births
1896 deaths
German neuroscientists
German people of French descent
German untitled nobility
German physiologists
Members of the Prussian Academy of Sciences
Recipients of the Pour le Mérite (civil class)
Corresponding members of the Saint Petersburg Academy of Sciences
Philosophers of mind
Scientists from Berlin
People from the Province of Brandenburg
University of Bonn alumni
Humboldt University of Berlin alumni
Academic staff of the Humboldt University of Berlin
Foreign Members of the Royal Society
Foreign associates of the National Academy of Sciences
Französisches Gymnasium Berlin alumni